Carmen Laroux (September 4, 1909 – August 24, 1942) was a Mexican film actress. Born in Durango, Mexico, she appeared in 19 films between 1927 and 1941.

Laroux is best known for her appearance as Señorita Rita in the Three Stooges film Saved by the Belle (1939). She also appeared in the John Wayne film The Desert Trail (1935). Her final film appearance was as a maid in Orson Welles' masterpiece Citizen Kane.

Laroux died of suicide at the age of 32 by ingesting ant poison on August 24, 1942.

Filmography

External links

1909 births
1942 deaths
Mexican film actresses
20th-century Mexican actresses
Mexican expatriates in the United States
Expatriate actresses in the United States
1942 suicides
Suicides by poison
Suicides in California